Woodlands Secondary School is a Secondary school that caters for students with severe or profound learning difficulties, aged between 11 and 18. Located in Luton, England, the school currently caters for 265 young people.   Sandra Clarke has been headteacher at the school since September 2021, having previously been the Deputy Head since 2012.

Ethos
The School aims to prepare students for the transition to adult life and to maximise their independence skills. The school works with  parents and guardians to support them with their child's education.

References

External links
 Homepage

Special schools in Luton
Special secondary schools in England
Community schools in Luton